Prince Varlam Gelovani (April 14, 1878 – February 22, 1915) was a Georgian lawyer and politician in the Russian Empire. 

Born of the noble house of Gelovani, he graduated from the Petersburg University in 1901 and briefly practiced law in St. Petersburg. He later joined the Georgian Social Federalist Party and was elected, in 1905, to the Russian Fourth Duma for the Kutais Governorate (western Georgia). Varlam Gelovani was a close friend of Alexander Kerensky, the future Prime-Minister of Russia in February–October 1917. Prince Gelovani was an excellent chess player and became President of the St Petersburg's Chess Club. During World War I, Gelovani led a Red Cross detachment of the Duma members to the Caucasus front where he died of typhus. The obituary in the literary magazine "Zvezda" (the Star) was written by Kerensky.

References 

1878 births
1915 deaths
People from Racha-Lechkhumi and Kvemo Svaneti
People from Kutais Governorate
Svan people
Nobility of Georgia (country)
Trudoviks
Members of the 4th State Duma of the Russian Empire
Lawyers from Georgia (country)
Politicians from Georgia (country)
People of World War I from Georgia (country)
Russian casualties of World War I
Lawyers from the Russian Empire